The national emblem of the Tuvan Autonomous Soviet Socialist Republic was adopted in 1962 by the government of the Tuvan Autonomous Soviet Socialist Republic. The emblem is identical to the emblem of the Russian Soviet Federative Socialist Republic.

History

First version 
By decree of the Presidium of the Supreme Soviet of the RSFSR of October 9, 1961, the Tuvan Autonomous Oblast was transformed into the Tuva Autonomous Soviet Socialist Republic, which was confirmed by the Decree of the Presidium of the Supreme Soviet of the USSR of October 10, 1961 and approved by the USSR Law of December 8, 1961

On January 10, 1962, at the first session of the first convocation of the Supreme Soviet of the Tuva ASSR, the Supreme Soviet of the Tuva ASSR adopted the Decree of the Tuva ASSR "On the State Emblem, State Flag and the Capital of the Tuva Autonomous Soviet Socialist Republic".Article 

In the design of the emblem. the inscription "ТУВИНСКАЯ АССР" was quoted in Russian completely and was located under the inscription "ТЫВА АССР".

Second version 
On November 10, 1978, at the extraordinary eighth session of the Supreme Soviet of the fourth convocation of the Tuva ASSR, the Supreme Soviet approved the first Constitution of the Tuva ASSR. The article 157 of the constitution described the State Emblem of the Tuva ASSR. A few minor changes was made in the emblem, on which a red five-pointed star was added to the emblem and the order of the inscriptions was changed: the inscription "ТУВИНСКАЯ АССР" was placed above the inscription "ТЫВА АССР".

Gallery 

Tuvan Autonomous Soviet Federative Socialist Republic
Tuvan ASSR
Tuvan ASSR
Tuvan ASSR
Tuvan ASSR
Tuvan ASSR